"I Wonder Who's Knitting for Me" is a World War I song written by Raymond Leveen and composed by Jessie Winne. It was published in 1917 by Winne Music Co. in New York City. The sheet music cover, illustrated by Starmer, depicts a soldier imagining a woman knitting for him, and features an inset photo of Bert Fitzgibbons.

The sheet music can be found at the Pritzker Military Museum & Library.

References 

Bibliography

1917 songs
Knitting
Songs of World War I
Songs with lyrics by Raymond Leveen
Songs with music by Jessie Winne